Benjamin Estoista Diokno (born March 31, 1948) is a Filipino economist currently serving as the 32nd Secretary of Finance under the administration of President Ferdinand "Bong Bong" Marcos Jr. since June 30, 2022. He previously served as Secretary of Budget and Management under the administration of President Rodrigo Duterte from 2016 to 2019, and under President Joseph Estrada from 1998 until the latter's ouster in 2001. He also served as the governor of the Bangko Sentral ng Pilipinas and ex officio chairman of the Anti-Money Laundering Council from 2019 to 2022 under President Duterte and undersecretary for Budget Operations of the Department of Budget and Management from 1986 to 1991 under President Corazon Aquino. 
From 2020 to 2021 during the COVID-19 pandemic, Diokno became the highest paid public officer in the Philippines.

Early life and education
Diokno is the son of Taaleños Leodegario Badillo Diokno (lived from c. 1898-August 24, 1982) and Loreta Estoista, Leodegario's second wife after the passing of his first spouse. Benjamin Diokno was born on March 31, 1948, in Taal, Batangas. His oldest brother Bayani Diokno (1943-2018), became a member of the US Navy for nearly three decades. His other siblings are Lucilo, Felipe, Emilio, Lydia (born 1942), Leonor, Amada, and Eduvijis. Leodegario Diokno was the son of Gregorio Diokno (born 1870) and grandson of Ángel Diokno (born c. 1830), the patriarch of the Taaleño surname. Diokno is the second cousin once removed (through common ancestor Ángel Diokno) of Atty. Jose Manuel "Chel" Diokno of the Free Legal Assistance Group (FLAG) and is six degrees apart from the attorney Sen. Jose W. Diokno, who is Atty. Chel Diokno's father and is considered as the father of human rights. Though they are under the large Diokno family that hails from Taal, the main Diokno branch represented by Chel ran against the Duterte administration in the 2019 and 2022 Senate election, the administration Benjamin Diokno served. 

The young Benjamin finished his bachelor's degree in a bachelor of arts program in Public Administration from the University of the Philippines (UP) Diliman in 1968, and earned his master's degree in Public Administration (1970) and Economics (1974) from the same university. Diokno was later awarded an honorary degree from UP. He also holds a Master of Arts in Political Economy (1976) from the Johns Hopkins University in Baltimore, Maryland, USA and a Ph.D. in Economics (1981) from the Maxwell School of Citizenship and Public Affairs, Syracuse University in Syracuse, New York, USA. His dissertation "Public Sector Resource Mobilization through Local Public Enterprises in Developing Countries : Issues, Practices and Case Studies" looked at using local public enterprise as alternative means of mobilizing funds for public purposes.

Career

During the Aquino administration, Diokno provided technical assistance to several major reforms such as the design of the 1986 Tax Reform Program, which simplified income tax and introduced the value-added tax (VAT), and the 1991 Local Government Code of the Philippines.

During the Estrada administration, Diokno initiated and instituted several reforms that would enhance transparency and improve the efficiency of the delivery of government services. The first major reform instituted was the "what you see is what you get" or WYSWIG policy that is a simplified system of fund release for the General Appropriations Act (GAA). This allowed agency heads to immediately plan and contract out projects by just looking at the GAA, which is available in print and at the DBM website, without waiting for the issuance of an allotment authority. Diokno initiated the reform of the government procurement system (GPS) through the adoption of rapidly improving information and communications technology. He secured technical assistance from the Canadian International Development Agency (CIDA) to help the GPS develop an electronic procurement system along the lines of the Canadian model. By August 1999, the DBM had two documents necessary to initiate reforms in public procurement. In early 2000, Diokno and USAID successfully concluded a substantial technical assistance program for the DBM's budget reform programs, which now included procurement reform. Other budget reforms instituted by Diokno concerned procedures for payment of accounts payable and terminal leave/ retirement gratuity benefits. The release of cash allocation were programmed and uploaded to the department's website while payments were made direct to the bank accounts of specific contractor.

Diokno is a Professor Emeritus of the School of Economics of the University of the Philippines-Diliman. He served as Fiscal Adviser to the Philippine Senate.  He also served as Chairman and CEO of the Philippine National Oil Company (PNOC) and Chairman of the Local Water Utilities Administration. He was also Chairman of the Board of Trustees of the Pamantasan ng Lungsod ng Maynila (City University of Manila).

In his third tour of duty as Budget Secretary, Diokno intended to pursue an expansionary fiscal policy to finance investments in human capital development and public infrastructure. In addition, he seeks for the passage of a Budget Reform Bill to ensure the compliance of future budgets with the pertinent laws of the land. He also aims to re-organize and professionalize the bureaucracy with a Government Rightsizing Act. On March 4, 2019, President Duterte appointed Diokno as the fifth governor of the Bangko Sentral ng Pilipinas (BSP), of which he will finish the unexpired term of his late predecessor, Nestor Espenilla Jr. which will end in July 2023. 

But on May 26, 2022, then President-elect Bongbong Marcos announced that he would nominate Diokno as the next Finance Secretary in his incoming administration, replacing Diokno in the role of the governor of BSP, with Felipe Medalla, who will finish Diokno's unexpired term. Diokno subsequently took his oath at the Malacañang Palace on June 30, 2022 following the Inauguration of Bongbong Marcos as President.

Diokno writes a column for BusinessWorld, Southeast Asia's first daily business newspaper.

References

External links
UP School of Economics: UPSE Faculty Profile
Benjamin Diokno curriculum vitae

|-

|-

|-

Living people
1948 births
People from Taal, Batangas
Governors of the Bangko Sentral ng Pilipinas
Secretaries of Budget and Management of the Philippines
Secretaries of Finance of the Philippines
20th-century Filipino economists
Bongbong Marcos administration cabinet members
Estrada administration cabinet members
Duterte administration cabinet members
Duterte administration personnel
Johns Hopkins University alumni
Maxwell School of Citizenship and Public Affairs alumni
University of the Philippines alumni
Academic staff of the University of the Philippines
21st-century Filipino economists